"As Long as You Follow" is a song by British-American rock band Fleetwood Mac. Performed by Christine McVie and written alongside her then-husband, Eddy Quintela, the song was one of two new tracks on the band's 1988 greatest hits album, along with "No Questions Asked". Lead guitarist Rick Vito singled out the guitar solo as his best work with Fleetwood Mac.

Release
Released as a single in the United Kingdom on 28 November 1988, the song reached number 66 on the UK Singles Chart late in the year. It missed the top 40 in the United States, peaking at number 43 on the Billboard Hot 100 chart in early 1989; however, the song did spend one week at number one on the Billboard adult contemporary chart in January 1989.

On its release, Cash Box predicted that the "western lilt to this easy-flowing tune sits well and should result in positive reaction on CHR, AC."

B-sides
One B-side to "As Long as You Follow" is a live version of the band's 1969 song "Oh Well". This live version was recorded at a 1987 Fleetwood Mac concert at the Cow Palace in San Francisco, California (filmed as the Tango in the Night concert video), and features lead vocals by new band member Billy Burnette. The 12-inch and CD single formats further included the original 1977 studio version of the Stevie Nicks track "Gold Dust Woman", as featured on Fleetwood Mac's 1977 album, Rumours. The single's cover sleeve is identical to its parent album, Greatest Hits.

Track listing
 7-inch, cassette, and US mini-CD single
 "As Long as You Follow"
 "Oh Well" (live)

 12-inch and UK mini-CD single
 "As Long as You Follow"
 "Oh Well" (live)
 "Gold Dust Woman"

Personnel
 Christine McVie – lead vocals, keyboards, synthesizers
 Stephen Croes – Synclavier
 Rick Vito – lead guitar, backing vocals
 Billy Burnette – rhythm guitar, backing vocals
 John McVie – bass
 Mick Fleetwood – drums, percussion
 Stevie Nicks – backing vocals

Charts

Weekly charts

Year-end charts

References

External links
 Single release info at discogs.com
 Song info at fleetwoodmac.net

1988 singles
1988 songs
Fleetwood Mac songs
Songs written by Christine McVie
Songs written by Eddy Quintela
Warner Records singles